The Principality of Anjewaci or Andzewatsi, was an Armenian dynasty of Median or Carduchian ancestry, who ruled in an eponymous region in southern Armenia (modern southeastern Anatolia in today's south east Turkey). It was located in southeast of Lake Van and northwest of Ake and centered at the castle of Kangvar.

In 780, its chief prince Tachat Andzevatsi was under the suzerainty of the Abbasid Caliph. After him, the dynasty declined and it was reduced to vassalage of the Artsrunis in 860.

Rulers

Gnel or Gunel Antzevatsi c. 374
Chmavon, Zuaren and Aravan Antzevatsi c. 445
Ohan Antsevatsi c. 480
Seouk Antzevatsi c. 480
Mouchel Antzevatsi (+863)
Helen (regent) 863
 Tatzates

References

Andzevatsi family
Armenian noble families
Medieval Armenian people